2013 Eurobasket squads may refer to:

FIBA EuroBasket 2013 squads
EuroBasket Women 2013 squads